Patrick Syme (1774–1845) was a Scottish flower-painter.

Life

Syme was born in Edinburgh on 17 September 1774, and educated there. In the Scottish public exhibitions, which began in 1808, his flower-pieces were much admired.

In 1803 Syme took up his brother's practice as a drawing-master, and concentrated on teaching. He was one of the associate artist members of the Royal Institution. He was also prominent in the foundation of the Scottish Academy, occupying the chair at the first meeting in May 1826, and becoming one of the council of four appointed there to manage its affairs.

Towards the end of his life Syme was art master at Dollar Academy. He died at Dollar, Clackmannanshire, in July 1845. He is buried in the parish churchyard the grave lying in the upper north-west section.

Works
If best known as a flower-painter, Syme painted portraits, and made natural history drawings of natural history. He published:

Practical Directions for Learning Flower Drawing (1810)
A translation of Abraham Gottlob Werner's Nomenclature of Colours (1814) 
 Treatise on British Song Birds (1823).

Family
Syme married Elizabeth Boswell of Balmuto daughter of Claud Irvine Boswell, Lord Balmuto, the judge. She had been his pupil since about 1810, the couple eloped in 1822, and her family's disapproval of the match was permanent. John Thomas Irvine Boswell the botanist was their son.

Notes

External links
 Patrick Syme at the Scottish National Gallery

Attribution

1774 births
1845 deaths
Scottish watercolourists
English watercolourists
Scottish portrait painters